German submarine U-73 was a Type VIIB U-boat of Nazi Germany's Kriegsmarine during World War II. She was laid down by Vegesacker Werft, Germany as yard number 1 on 5 November 1939, launched on 27 July 1940 and commissioned on 30 September of the same year under Kapitänleutnant (Kptlt.) Helmut Rosenbaum.

U-73 carried out 15 patrols between early 1941 and late 1943, sinking eight ships and four warships. She also damaged a further three commercial vessels. She was part of five wolfpacks.

Design
German Type VIIB submarines were preceded by the shorter Type VIIA submarines. U-73 had a displacement of  when at the surface and  while submerged. She had two shafts and two  propellers.

U-73 was fitted with five  torpedo tubes (four fitted at the bow and one at the stern), fourteen torpedoes, one  SK C/35 naval gun, 220 rounds, and one  anti-aircraft gun The boat had a complement of between forty-four and sixty.

Service history

First patrol
U-73 departed the Helgoland (also known as Heligoland) for her first patrol on 8 February 1941. Her route took her the length of the North Sea, through the 'gap' separating the Faroe and Shetland Islands, north-west toward Iceland, then south and west.

She sank the Waynegate on 24 February 1941 south of Iceland.

The boat arrived at Lorient, on the French Atlantic coast, on 2 March.

Second patrol
U-73 sank three ships on the same day, 3 April 1941. They were: the Alderpool, the Westpool and the British Viscount, all in the vicinity of Iceland.

Third, fourth and fifth patrols
These sorties were conducted in mid-Atlantic but were uneventful. On May 26, 1941, U-73 was ordered to help the wounded German battleship Bismarck which was under attack from British destroyers. On the night of May 26 U-73 spotted star shells that illuminated Bismarck and also saw the Bismarck firing her guns. But U-73 was unable to attack the destroyers due to Force 7 to 9 winds. U-73 reported the Bismarcks position to Group West but the positions proved inaccurate. U-73 then returned to port in France.

Sixth patrol
U-73 entered the Mediterranean Sea via the heavily defended Straits of Gibraltar on 14 January 1942 during her sixth patrol. Rosenbaum claimed to have sunk a destroyer in February, but post-war records offer no confirmation. She docked at La Spezia in Italy on 12 February.

Seventh patrol
The damage was such that the boat was unable to dive and had to return to La Spezia on 26 March 1942. The U-boat was under repair at La Spezia for four months.

Eighth patrol
On 11 August 1942 she sank the aircraft carrier  during Operation Pedestal (supplying Malta). Rosenbaum was awarded the Knight's Cross and sent to command the Black Sea U-boat flotilla.

Ninth patrol
First watch officer Horst Deckert was promoted to command U-73. He was the son of German-American parents living in Chicago and had joined U-73s crew as a midshipman in 1940. U-73 was depth-charged during an unsuccessful attack on Operation Torch (the invasion of French North Africa) troopships on 7 November. On 10 November, U-73 missed the battleship  with four torpedoes launched at a range of five kilometers.

She also damaged the Lalande off Oran on 14 November 1942. This ship was under repair until June 1943.

Tenth and eleventh patrols
U-73 was damaged in an air attack on 5 December 1942 and forced to return to base.

The boat was also attacked by a British Lockheed Hudson of 500 Squadron on 27 December 1942; damage was slight – the Hudson was shot down.

12th patrol
As allied forces prepared for Operation Husky (the invasion of Sicily), U-73 sank the 1,600-ton British freighter Brinkburn off Oran on 21 June 1943 and damaged the 8,300-ton Royal Navy oiler  on 28 June 1943. The Brinkburn exploded with such force that damaged food cans and two 75 mm shells, still in their transit boxes, were found on the U-boat's bridge.

The boat tied up at Toulon in France on 1 July 1943.

13th patrol
Patrol number thirteen took U-73 to Sicily; she reached the Straits of Messina (between the island and the Italian mainland), on 19 August 1943.

14th patrol
The torpedo missed.

15th patrol and loss
U-73 found the convoy GUS-24 off Oran on 16 December 1943 and torpedoed the 7,200-ton American Liberty ship SS John S. Copley. As the damaged vessel returned to port, the destroyers ,  and  left Mers-el-Kebir to find the U-boat. She was located by sonar at 18:15. Hull turbulence made the U-boat's hydrophones ineffective at the speed U-73 was leaving the area, so she was unaware of the destroyers until Woolseys pattern of depth charges exploded below the submarine at 18:39. Sea water poured in between the bow torpedo tubes and from a salt water inlet valve for the diesel engine cooling system. All ballast tanks were blown to bring U-73 to the surface as inflowing water exceeded pumping capacity. U-73 surfaced in darkness at 19:27 and men manned the heavy machine guns. The destroyers promptly detected her on radar and illuminated the submarine with searchlights. She sank by the stern following a brief exchange of gunfire, 34 of the crew were rescued by 22:10. Three of Woolseys crew were wounded by machine gun fire and sixteen of the U-boat crew perished.

Wolfpacks
U-73 took part in five wolfpacks, namely:
 West (31 May – 16 June 1941) 
 Kurfürst (16 – 20 June 1941) 
 Grönland (12 – 27 August 1941) 
 Reissewolf (21 – 31 October 1941) 
 Wal (10 – 15 November 1942)

Summary of raiding history

* Carried by 

** Carried by Arthur Middleton

Sensors

Radar
U-73 was one of the few U-boats to be fitted with a FuMO 61 Hohentwiel U-Radar system. It was installed on the starboard side of the conning tower.

See also
 Convoy SC 26
 Mediterranean U-boat Campaign (World War II)

References

Notes

Citations

Bibliography

External links

German Type VIIB submarines
U-boats commissioned in 1940
U-boats sunk in 1943
World War II submarines of Germany
World War II shipwrecks in the Mediterranean Sea
1940 ships
Ships built in Bremen (state)
U-boats sunk by US warships
Maritime incidents in December 1943